The 1925 Tempe State Bulldogs football team was an American football team that represented Tempe State Teachers College (later renamed Arizona State University) as an independent during the 1925 college football season. In their third season under head coach Aaron McCreary, the Bulldogs compiled a 6–2 record and outscored their opponents by a combined total of 154 to 59. The team's games included a 13–3 loss in the Arizona–Arizona State football rivalry. Ed Ellsworth was the team captain.

Schedule

References

Tempe State
Arizona State Sun Devils football seasons
Tempe State Bulldogs football